The NZR M class were a series of four tank engines built in England for the Otago railways Bluff to Winton section. They were acquired by NZR in the late 1870s and rebuilt in the late 1880s. As rebuilt they were not very successful and were used in shunting duties until retirement in the 1920s.

They were rather ineffectual engines derisively called the Pullets by engine men. They were used on the Napier Express at the turn of the century; either in pairs or with a Baldwin N class when the duo was called a  'en and chicken.

Footnotes

References

Bibliography

External links
Class M on Trainweb

Steam locomotives of New Zealand
Scrapped locomotives
Railway locomotives introduced in 1875
3 ft 6 in gauge locomotives of New Zealand